John Wiswell is an American science fiction and fantasy author. His fiction is known for making outlandish and unsettling concepts feel familiar, often overlapping with metaphors for disability. He has written fiction for numerous venues including Nature Magazine, the NoSleep Podcast, and Uncanny Magazine.

Awards 
In 2021, Wiswell won the Nebula Award for Best Short Story for his work "Open House on Haunted Hill" published in Diabolical Plots. This work was also a finalist for the Hugo Award for Best Short Story, Locus Award for Best Short Story, and World Fantasy Award for Short Fiction.

His short story "8-Bit Free Will" originally published in PodCastle was shortlisted for the 2021 British Fantasy Award for Short Fiction.

His novelette "That Story Isn't The Story" published in Uncanny Magazine won the 2022 Locus Award for Best Novelette, as well as being a finalist for the Nebula Award for Best Novelette and the Hugo Award for Best Novelette.

References 

American science fiction writers
American fantasy writers
Year of birth missing (living people)
Living people
Nebula Award winners
American male short story writers